Myrmica ademonia is a species of ant, originally described from Russia. It can be found in East Russia, Kuril Islands, North Korea, South Korea, and the  Maluku Islands.

References
Bolton, B. 1995. A new general catalogue of the ants of the world. Cambridge, Mass.: Harvard University Press, 504 pp. [Page 277: Replacement name for Myrmica aspersa]
Kupyanskaya, A. N. 1990. Ants of the Far Eastern USSR. Vladivostok: Akademiya Nauk SSSR, 258 pp. [Page 105: Junior primary homonym: worker, queen, male described.]

Myrmica
Insects described in 1995
Taxa named by Barry Bolton